Eóganacht Chaisil were a branch of the Eóganachta, the ruling dynasty of Munster between the 5th and 10th centuries. They took their name from Cashel (County Tipperary) which was the capital of the early Catholic kingdom of Munster. They were descended from Óengus mac Nad Froích (died 489), the first Christian King of Munster, through his son Feidlimid mac Óengusa.

In the seventh century, they split into two main clans. Cenél Fíngin descended from Fíngen mac Áedo Duib (d. 618) and became the O'Sullivans and MacGillycuddys. The McGillycuddy are a sept of the O'Sullivan's.  A descendant of Fíngen was Feidlimid mac Cremthanin (d. 847). Clann Faílbe descended from Faílbe Flann mac Áedo Duib (d. 639) and became the MacCarthy dynasty, rulers of the Kingdom of Desmond following their displacement by the Normans. The O'Callaghans belong to the same line as the MacCarthys, while the MacAuliffes are a sept of the MacCarthys.

The Eóganacht Chaisil were considered part of the inner circle of Eoganachta dynasties which included the Eóganacht Glendamnach and Eóganacht Áine branches. These three branches rotated the kingship of Munster in the 7th and much of the 8th centuries. The Chaisil branch provided most of the kings in the 9th and 10th centuries in Munster. Kings of Cashel and Munster from the Eóganacht Chaisil were:

Kings of Eóganacht Chaisil

 Fíngen mac Áedo Duib, d. 618
 Faílbe Flann mac Áedo Duib, d. 639
 Máenach mac Fíngin, d. 661
 Colgú mac Faílbe Flaind, d. 678
 Cormac mac Ailello, d. 712
 Tnúthgal mac Donngaile, d. 820
 Feidlimid mac Cremthanin, d. 847
 Áilgenán mac Donngaile, d. 853
 Máel Gualae, d. 859
 Cormac mac Cuilennáin, d. 908
 Cellachán Caisil, d. 954
 Donnchad mac Cellacháin, d. 963

Annalistic references

See Annals of Inisfallen (AI)

 AI954.2 Repose of Dub Inse, learned bishop of Ireland, and of Cellachán, king of Caisel, and of Éladach the learned, abbot of Ros Ailithir, and of Uarach, bishop of Imlech Ibuir, and of Célechair, abbot of Cluain Moccu Nóis and Cluain Iraird, and of Cormac Ua Maíl Shluaig, learned sage of Mumu, and of Lugaid Ua Maíl Shempail, abbot of Domnach Pátraic, and of Cenn Faelad son of Suibne, anchorite of Cluain Ferta Brénainn.

References

 Byrne, Francis John (2001), Irish Kings and High-Kings, Dublin: Four Courts Press, 
 Charles-Edwards, T. M. (2000), Early Christian Ireland, Cambridge: Cambridge University Press, 
 Ireland's History in Maps

Kings of Munster
MacCarthy dynasty
Eóganachta